Hacıvəli (also, Adzhiyely) is a village in the Absheron Rayon of Azerbaijan.

References 

Populated places in Absheron District